The 1995 DFS Classic was a women's tennis tournament played on grass courts at the Edgbaston Priory Club in Birmingham in the United Kingdom that was part of Tier III of the 1995 WTA Tour. The tournament was held from 12 June until 18 June 1995. Third-seeded Zina Garrison-Jackson won the singles title.

Finals

Singles

 Zina Garrison-Jackson defeated  Lori McNeil 6–3, 6–3
 It was Garrison-Jackson's only title of the year and the 37th of her career.

Doubles

 Manon Bollegraf /  Rennae Stubbs defeated  Nicole Bradtke /  Kristine Radford 3–6, 6–4, 6–4
 It was Bollegraf's 3rd title of the year and the 19th of her career. It was Stubbs' only title of the year and the 9th of her career.

External links
 ITF tournament edition details

DFS Classic
Birmingham Classic (tennis)
DFS Classic
DFS Classic